The Queen of Office is a 2013 South Korean television series starring Kim Hye-soo, Oh Ji-ho, Jung Yu-mi, Lee Hee-joon, Jeon Hye-bin, and Jo Kwon. It aired on KBS2 from April 1 to May 21, 2013 on Mondays and Tuesdays at 22:00 for 16 episodes. Kim later won the Daesang (or "Grand Prize"), the highest honor at the 2013 KBS Drama Awards.

Based on the 2007 Japanese drama , the comedy/drama series uses the modern Korean workplace culture as a backdrop and revolves around charismatic perfect employee Miss Kim, who's good at everything that even her bosses are a little afraid of her. But her life is shrouded in mystery and she always disappears after her three-month temp contract is up.

The early working title was Come Back, Miss Kim.

Cast

Main characters
 Kim Hye-soo as Miss Kim
Always wearing a neutral-colored business suit and with her hair firmly in place, Miss Kim is a non-regular worker. She holds 124 skill certifications in all sorts of fields, executes work with perfection, and speaks a bunch of languages including Russian. She traverses the jungle of office buildings and suddenly disappears after her three-month work contract ends. Her very name inspires awe in her colleagues, and even her superiors are afraid of her. Miss Kim goes to work at 9 a.m., and leaves at 6 p.m., unwilling to spend a microsecond more. She refuses to do work outside of her job description, never misses her lunch break, and the company wouldn't dare ask her to come in on weekends. Miss Kim says that if the company doesn't approve of her actions, it should hire three more regular employees since she does three people's work in a limited period of time. Her life outside work is shrouded in mystery: No one knows her first name, her age, or her background. Miss Kim's confidence about her ability, and also the frustration from her contract situation, allows her to be protective about her private life and blatantly reject after-work drinking sessions and other oppressive traditions of the macho corporate culture. She avoids all personal interactions, and instead chooses to live her life in her own way.

 Oh Ji-ho as Jang Gyu-jik
Jang Gyu-jik works in the upper management of Y-Jang Food Company (his name is a pun on jung gyu-jik, the Korean phrase for permanent employee). He finished his MBA in the United States, then returned to Korea. Upbeat and energetic and armed with professionalism and good work ethics, Gyu-jik is strongly devoted to his company, and puts everything on the line for his work. But he treats temps dismissively, thinking they only exist to assist regular employees with menial chores. Hot-headed and with a rather childish mentality, Gyu-jik keeps attempting to humiliate Miss Kim, but he is frequently stymied by her unexpected reactions. Gyu-jik and Miss Kim engage in numerous conflicts and confrontations, but gradually feelings of respect and love grow between them, two seemingly incompatible people.

 Jung Yu-mi as Jung Joo-ri
Jung Joo-ri has failed countless job interviews because she came from a third-rate university and has a less-than-stellar resume. Thus, she gets hired at Y-Jang Food Company only as a temp. She tries her hardest at everything but keeps making mistakes, and she lapses into saturi (or regional/rural dialect) during stressful moments. Joo-ri has a crush on her boss Jang Gyu-jik.

 Lee Hee-joon as Mu Jeong-han
He entered the company at the same time as his friend and colleague, Jang Gyu-jik. But as Gyu-jik moved up the ranks, Jeong-han kept getting left behind. Jeong-han is cold and serious (his name literally means "heartless" in Korean), and different from Gyu-jik in every way, from attitude, nature, to personal values.

 Jeon Hye-bin as Geum Bit-na
Geum Bit-na (her name means "shines like gold") was hired at the same time as Jung Joo-ri. But unlike Joo-ri, she has all the right qualifications and a first-rate education, and gets hired as a regular employee. She also happens to be the ex-girlfriend of Jang Gyu-jik.

 Jo Kwon as Kye Kyung-woo
A very polite and upright new hire.

Supporting characters
Marketing and Sales Division
Kim Eung-soo as Hwang Gab-deuk
Lee Ji-hoon as Gu Young-shik
Na Seung-ho as Shin Min-goo
Lee Mi-do as Park Bong-hee
Song Ji-in as Oh Ji-rang
Lee So-yoon as Yeon Na-ra
Kim Gi-cheon as Go Jung-do

Product Development Division
Kim Na-woon as Yeo Jang-mi
Kim Ki-yeon as Hong Min-ah
Chae Ji-won as the youngest staff member

BAR Machu Picchu 
Kim Bo-mi as Jo Ho-boon
Lee Hyun-jae as Julisesa

Dispatch's Quality Job Manager
Oh Yong as Ahn Jong-chul

Y-Jang employees
Park Jin-wook as Ahn Tae-soo
Lee In-chul as Park Bon-jwa
Min Sung-ok as Maeng In-sa

Home Mart
Kim Kwang-kyu as manager Han
Kim Hae-gon as mart director

Super Home Shopping
Go Soo-hee as Choi Da-sung
Lee Jun-hyeok as Han Jung-soo

Dae Han Bank
Lee Deok-hee as Jin Mi-ja
Kang Shin-chul as Won Joo-hwan
Kim Jong-gu as Geum Bae-jib

Ong Ja Yeom
Kwon Sung-deok as Ong Ah-jib
Han Seung-hyun as Ong So-shin
Lee Ah-ra as daughter in-law

Extended cast
Kim Mi-kyung as Kim Sook-ja, Jung Joo-ri's mother
Lee Ji-ha as Show host
Tatina as Sara Siva
Oh Chang-hoon as Park Seung-oh
Gong Sang-ah as Son Bo-ra
Choi In-kyung as Kang Dong-hee

Cameos
Yang Sang-gook as car wash part-timer 1 (ep 1)
Kim Ki-yeol as car wash part-timer 2 (ep 1)
Heo Kyung-hwan as Chinese restaurant deliveryman (ep 1)
Kim Joon-hyun as construction worker (ep 1)
Kim Gi-ri as bouncer (ep 1)
Jung Il-woo as Cha Chi-soo, Chasung Group soy sauce model (ep 3)
Kim Byung-man as seasoned raw crab master (ep 3)
Jung Won-joong as Jang Dae-han
Myung Gye-nam as owner of Mother's Hand Restaurant

Ratings

Awards and nominations

International broadcast
It aired in Japan on cable channel KNTV from April 1 to May 21, 2013.
It aired in Thailand on Workpoint TV from December 16, 2015 to January 16, 2016 on Tuesdays to Saturdays at 04:00-5:00 a.m.

References

External links 
  
 
 
 

2013 South Korean television series debuts
2013 South Korean television series endings
Korean Broadcasting System television dramas
Korean-language television shows
South Korean television series based on Japanese television series
South Korean romantic comedy television series
Television series by KBS Media